Druzhba is a rural locality (a settlement) in Bryzgalovskoye Rural Settlement, Kameshkovsky District, Vladimir Oblast, Russia. The population was 796 as of 2010. There are 5 streets.

Geography 
Druzhba is located 7 km northeast of Kameshkovo (the district's administrative centre) by road. Novki is the nearest rural locality.

References 

Rural localities in Kameshkovsky District